The Samsung Galaxy Note 5 (stylized as SΛMSUNG Galaxy Note5) is an Android-based phablet designed, developed, produced and marketed by Samsung Electronics. Unveiled on 13 August 2015, it is the successor to the Galaxy Note 4 and part of the Samsung Galaxy Note series.

The Galaxy Note 5 carries over hardware and software features from the Galaxy S6, including a changed design with a glass backing, improved camera, and fingerprint scanner. The precluded camera software also includes built in livestreaming functionality as well as features meant for use with the device's bundled, spring-loaded stylus. The device was released together with the Samsung Galaxy S6 Edge+.

The device received positive reviews from critics, who praised the upgraded build quality over prior models, along with improvements to its performance, camera, and other changes. Similarly to the S6, Samsung was criticized for making the Galaxy Note 5's battery non-removable, and removing the ability to expand its storage via microSD. It was argued that these changes potentially alienated power users—especially because the Galaxy Note series had historically been oriented towards this segment of the overall market.

The Galaxy Note 5 is briefly succeeded by the Samsung Galaxy Note 7, released in August 2016. However, that device was ultimately recalled and pulled from the market after repeated incidents where batteries overheated and caught on fire. The discontinued Note 7 was later re-launched as Galaxy Note Fan Edition in July 2017, while a fully-fledged successor, the Samsung Galaxy Note 8, was released in September 2017.

Specifications

Hardware

Design 
The Galaxy Note 5 adopts a similar design and construction to the Galaxy S6, featuring a unibody metal frame and glass backing, although unlike the standard S6, the back of the device is curved. It is offered in dark blue, white, gold, and silver color finishes. The storage slot for the S Pen stylus uses a spring-loaded mechanism to eject the pen for more convenience. Due to the design, inserting the pen in reverse could cause it to get stuck. This issue is known as "pengate".

Functionality 
Like on the Galaxy S6, Mobile high-definition link, a feature introduced with the Galaxy S2 and Galaxy Note 1 in 2011, has been removed from the series with the Galaxy Note 5.

The Galaxy Note 5 has a non-removable 3,000 mAh lithium-ion battery and supports the Qi open interface standard.

The Note 5 features a 5.7-inch 1440p Super AMOLED display. It is powered by a 64-bit Exynos 7 Octa 7420 system-on-chip, consisting of four 2.1 GHz Cortex-A57 cores, and four 1.5 GHz Cortex-A53 cores, and 4 GB of LPDDR4 RAM.

The Galaxy Note 5 is available with either 32 GB or 64 GB of storage (a special "Winter Edition" exclusive to South Korea offers 128 GB storage), and utilizes a 3020 mAh battery with wireless and fast charging (Qualcomm Quick Charge 2.0) support. Samsung claims wired fast charging and wireless fast charging to be able to charge the phone entirely in 90 and 120 minutes respectively.

Similarly to the S6, the Note 5 does not offer expandable storage or the ability to remove the battery, unlike its predecessor.

As with the S6, the fingerprint scanner in the home button now uses a touch-based scanning mechanism rather than swipe-based, and the device also supports Samsung Pay.

Camera 
The 16-megapixel rear-facing camera is identical to the Galaxy S6, with a f/1.9 aperture, optical image stabilization, object tracking autofocus, and real-time HDR. Video recording is supported at 2160p with 30 frames per second, 1080p with 60fps and 720p with 120fps.

Software 

The Galaxy Note 5 shipped with Android 5.1.1 Lollipop. The new "Screen off memo" feature allows the phone to be awoken directly to a note screen when the stylus is removed. The Camera app on the Note 5 also allows public and private livestreaming directly to YouTube, and supports export of RAW images.

In February 2016, Samsung began to release Android 6.0.1 Marshmallow for the Galaxy Note 5.

The Galaxy Note 5 also gradually received the Nougat (Android 7.0) update with TouchWiz Grace UX during the first and second quarters of 2017.

European release 
The Galaxy Note 5 was not released in Europe, in favor of solely marketing the S6 Edge+ in the region. Samsung European Vice President of Brand and Marketing Rory O'Neill explained that the decision was based upon market research showing that consumers in the region primarily viewed large-screen phones as being oriented towards entertainment, and not productivity.

Reception

Reviews 
The Verge complimented the higher-quality build of the Galaxy Note 5, describing it as being a "more humane device" due to its lighter build with thinner bezels in comparison to the Galaxy Note 4, along with its display, performance and additional S Pen features. However, the Galaxy Note 5 was panned for not offering a removable battery, expandable storage, or a 128 GB model, considering these oversights to be inappropriate for a device in a series that was "unapologetically meant for power users." The device was also described as being the result of Samsung "[holding themselves] back", having dropped the "old, unfettered excessiveness of the old Note" in favour of developing a "consumer-friendly" device with only minor upgrades over the S6.

TechRadar shared a similar degree of positivity towards the Galaxy Note 5, noting that "the sacrifices Samsung felt it needed to make to get to that premium Note 5 design have turned off some longtime users. Thankfully, there's a lot more to like about this phone upgrade than dislike."

Issues 
Following its release, it was discovered that inserting the pen into the Note 5's storage slot backwards could result in permanent damage to the spring mechanism, making the stylus become stuck, or damaging the sensor that detects when the S Pen is removed; all of these scenarios render the stylus unusable.

Samsung was aware of this issue and stated that it had provided a warning against backward pen insertion in the Galaxy Note 5's manual, but placed more prominent warning labels on the device itself on later shipments.

In January 2016, it was reported that the design of the mechanism had been revised to allow the safe ejection of a pen accidentally inserted backwards, without causing damage to the sensor.

Sales 
In its first three days on sale, over 75,000 units of the Note 5 (together with the S6 Edge+) were sold in South Korea, exceeding the rate of sales of the previous year's models. A study by AnTuTu detailed that this smartphone was one of the most popular Android devices in the first half of 2016.

Other 
The device has been featured in the music video of Focus, a song by Ariana Grande, with her writing the phrase "Focus on me" using the stylus.

References

External links 

 

Samsung smartphones
Samsung mobile phones
Samsung Galaxy
5
Mobile phones introduced in 2015
Mobile phones with stylus
Mobile phones with 4K video recording
Discontinued smartphones